Bishop Mijo Gorski (born 17 September 1952) is a Croatian Roman Catholic prelate who currently serves as a Titular Bishop of Epidaurum and an Auxiliary Bishop of Archdiocese of Zagreb since 3 May 2010.

Education
Bishop Gorski was born into a Croatian Roman Catholic family as the seventh child in the Hrvatsko Zagorje region. 

After graduation the primary school and a classical gymnasium in the Archbishop's Minor Seminary in Šalata, Zagreb, he consequently joined the Major Theological Seminary in Zagreb and in the same time to the University of Zagreb, where studied until 1977, and was ordained as priest on June 26, 1977 for the Archdiocese of Zagreb, after completed his philosophical and theological studies.

Pastoral and educationcal work
After ordination, Fr. Gorski from 1978 to 1979 served as assistant priest in Vrbovec, and from 1979 to 1982 in the parish of St. Blaise in Zagreb. From 1982 to 1997 he served as the administrator of the parish of St. Matej in Dugave, Zagreb, where he also built a parish church. From 1997 to 1998 he was the administrator of the parish of St. Anastasia in Samobor and the dean of the Okić deanery. 

From 1998 to 2002 he was the parish priest of St. Blaise in Zagreb, when he also served as episcopal vicar for the city of Zagreb. In 2002, he was appointed Rector of the Archbishop's Major Theological Seminary, a position he held until 2008. In 2008, Fr. Gorski was appointed a canon of the Primate's Chapter of Zagreb, and director of the Archdiocesan Institution for the Maintenance of the Clergy and Other Church Officials. He is a member of the Presbyterian Council and the Association of Advisors of the Zagreb Archdiocese.

Prelate
On May 3, 2010, he was appointed by Pope Benedict XVI as a Titular Bishop of Epidaurum and an Auxiliary Bishop of the Archdiocese of Zagreb. On July 3, 2010, he was consecrated as bishop by Cardinal Josip Bozanić and other prelates of the Roman Catholic Church in the Cathedral of Assumption of Blessed Virgin Mary and St. Stephen of Hungary in Zagreb.

References

1952 births
Living people
People from Krapina-Zagorje County
University of Zagreb alumni
Academic staff of the University of Zagreb
21st-century Roman Catholic bishops in Croatia
Bishops appointed by Pope Benedict XVI